The Hebrew University-Hadassah Braun School of Public Health and Community Medicine is a public health school in Israel affiliated with the Hebrew University of Jerusalem and Hadassah Medical Center.

History
Braun School of Public Health and Community Medicine was founded in 1961. It was the country's first public health school.The school offers a one year International Master of Health program in English that is APHEA accredited. The program has over 850 graduates from 100 countries.

Notable faculty
Irit Cohen-Manheim PhD
Hagai Levine
Ora Paltiel

References

External links
Official Wbaite

Schools of public health
Hebrew University of Jerusalem
Medical schools in Israel